FC Biokhimik-Mordovia Saransk was a Russian football team from Saransk. It played professionally in 1992–1993 and 1996–2004. In 2004 it merged into FC Mordovia Saransk. Their best result was 4th place in the Zone 3 of the Russian Second Division in 1993.

Team name history
 1992: FC MGU Saransk
 1993–1994: FC Saranskeksport Saransk
 1995: FC Biokhimik Saransk
 1996–2004: FC Biokhimik-Mordovia Saransk

Results
 1995 – 2nd place in the Amateur Football League (the Third Division), zone “Povolzhye”
 1996 – 7th place in the Third League, zone 5
 1997 – 7th place in the Third League, zone 5
 1998 – 8th place in the Second Division, zone “Povolzhye”
 1999 – 8th place in the Second Division, zone “Povolzhye”
 2000 – 12th place in the Second Division, zone “Povolzhye”
 2001 – 10th place in the Second Division, zone “Povolzhye”
 2002 – 5th place in the Second Division, zone “Povolzhye”
 2003 – 18th place in the Second Division, zone “Center”
 2004 – 7th place in the Second Division, zone “Center”

External links
  Team history at KLISF

Association football clubs established in 1992
Association football clubs disestablished in 2005
Defunct football clubs in Russia
Sport in Saransk
1992 establishments in Russia
2005 disestablishments in Russia